South Korea (IOC designation:Korea) participated in the 1982 Asian Games held in Delhi, India from November 19, 1982, to December 4, 1982.

Medal summary

Medal table

Medalists

Boxing

Heo Yong-mo
Kim Dong-kil
Lee Hae-jung
Moon Sung-kil

Swimming 

 Choi Yun-hui

References

Korea, South
1982
Asian Games